Aristidis Kokkoris (born 16 July 1998) is a Greek professional footballer who plays as a winger for Super League 2 club Iraklis.

Honours
Volos
Football League: 2018–19

References

1998 births
Living people
Greek footballers
Greek expatriate footballers
Super League Greece players
Football League (Greece) players
Cypriot Second Division players
Panegialios F.C. players
Panetolikos F.C. players
Volos N.F.C. players
Othellos Athienou F.C. players
Kavala F.C. players
Association football wingers
Footballers from Patras